Bollywood Veggies Organic Farm (also known as Bollywood Veggies) is a farming collective and organic growing education center located in the Kranji district of North West Singapore. The center was launched in 2000 by Ivy Singh-Lim and her husband, former NTUC FairPrice chief executive, Lim Ho Seng, as a project to run after they had both retired from their previous careers. Neil Humphreys covered the center in his 2006 book Final Notes From a Great Island. 

In 2010 Bollywood Veggies was charged with failing to have its buildings inspected by a structural engineer or hold the inspections after several requests that they do so. Singh-Lim and Seng stated that they did not own the buildings on the center's property (as they were leasing the land ) and that they had not received any prior notices about the requested inspections, to which the courts stated that they were the legal owners of the buildings. They were later cleared of the charges on March 25, 2011, after a judge ruled that it could not be proven beyond a reasonable doubt that Bollywood Veggies had received the notices.

References

External links
 

Agriculture companies of Singapore
Singaporean brands